This is a list of notable Canadians of Armenian descent.

Academics
Adam Morton – philosopher

Arts and media
bbno$ pronounced "baby no money" born Alexander Leon Gumuchian – Canadian rapper, singer-songwriter of Armenian descent
David Alpay – actor
Ashot Ariyan – composer and pianist 
Raffi Armenian – conductor
André Arthur – radio host and independent MP
Araz Artinian – photographer, filmmaker and humanitarian worker
Isabel Bayrakdarian – soprano
Garen Boyajian – actor
Atom Egoyan – filmmaker
Eve Egoyan – pianist and artist
Hagop Goudsouzian – filmmaker
Levon Ichkhanian – guitarist, entertainment personality
Malak Karsh – photographer
Yousuf Karsh – photographer
Maryvonne Kendergi – pianist
Arsinee Khanjian – actress
Serouj Kradjian – pianist
Catherine Manoukian – violinist
Andrea Martin – actress
Patrick Masbourian – radio and television personality, film director
Peter Oundjian – violinist and conductor
Alice Panikian – 2006 Miss Universe Canada
Raffi – children's singer-songwriter
Vahram Sargsyan – composer and choral conductor
Anita Sarkeesian – feminist media critic
John Vernon – actor

Business
Jack Kachkar – businessman

Politics and public service
Andre Arthur – former Independent Conservative MP, 2006-2011, talk radio host
Sarkis Assadourian – former Liberal MP, 1993-2004
Ann Cavoukian – former Information and Privacy Commissioner of Ontario
Harout Chitilian – city councilor and chairman of the City Council of Montreal
Raymond Setlakwe – entrepreneur, politician, lawyer

Scientists
Levon Pogosian – astrophysicist

Sports
Zack Kassian - Hockey player

Writers
Shaunt Basmajian – author
Artashes Keshishyan - author

See also
 List of French-Armenians
 List of Armenian-Americans
 List of Russian-Armenians
 List of Armenians
 Armenian diaspora
 Canadians of Armenian descent

References

External links
Armenian Community Centre of Toronto

Lists of Canadian people by ethnic or national origin

Canadians
Armenian